Cryptandra is a genus of flowering plants family Rhamnaceae and is endemic to Australia. Most plants in the genus Cryptandra are spiny, heath-like shrubs with small, clustered leaves and flowers crowded at the ends of branches, the flowers usually small, surrounded by brown bracts, and with a tube-shaped hypanthium, the petals hooded over the anthers.

Taxonomy
The genus Cryptandra was first formally described in 1798 by James Edward Smith in the Transactions of the Linnean Society of London. The genus name means "hidden man", referring to the stamens.

List of species
The following is a list of species of Cryptandra accepted by the Australian Plant Census as at August 2022:

 Cryptandra alpina Hook.f. (Tas.)
 Cryptandra amara Sm. (Qld., N.S.W., A.C.T., Vic., Tas.)
 Cryptandra apetala Ewart & Jean White (W.A.)
Cryptandra apetala var. anomala Rye
Cryptandra apetala Ewart & Jean White var. apetala Rye
 Cryptandra arbutiflora Fenzl (W.A.)
Cryptandra arbutiflora  Fenzlvar. arbutiflora Rye
Cryptandra arbutiflora var. borealis Rye
Cryptandra arbutiflora var. pygmaea Rye
Cryptandra arbutiflora var. tubulosa (Fenzl) Benth.
 Cryptandra aridicola Rye (W.A.)
 Cryptandra armata C.T.White & W.D.Francis (Qld., N.S.W.)
 Cryptandra beverleyensis Rye (W.A.)
 Cryptandra campanulata Schltdl. (S.A.)
 Cryptandra ciliata A.R.Bean (Qld.)
 Cryptandra congesta Rye (W.A.)
 Cryptandra connata C.A.Gardner (W.A.)
 Cryptandra craigiae Rye (W.A.)
 Cryptandra debilis A.R.Bean (Qld.)
 Cryptandra dielsii C.A.Gardner ex Rye (W.A.)
 Cryptandra distigma Rye (W.A.)
 Cryptandra ericoides Sm. (N.S.W., Vic.)
 Cryptandra exilis D.I.Morris (Tas.)
 Cryptandra exserta Rye (W.A.)
 Cryptandra filiformis A.R.Bean (Qld.)
 Cryptandra gemmata A.R.Bean (N.T.)
 Cryptandra glabriflora Benth. (W.A.)
 Cryptandra graniticola Rye (W.A.)
 Cryptandra hispidula Reissek & F.Muell. (S.A.)
 Cryptandra imbricata Rye (W.A.)
 Cryptandra inconspicua Rye (W.A.)
 Cryptandra intermedia (Rye) Rye (W.A.)
 Cryptandra intonsa Rye (W.A.)
 Cryptandra intratropica W.Fitzg. (W.A.)
 Cryptandra lanosiflora F.Muell. (Qld., N.S.W.)
 Cryptandra leucopogon Meisn. ex Reissek (W.A.)
 Cryptandra longistaminea F.Muell. (Qld., N.S.W.)
 Cryptandra magniflora F.Muell. (Vic.)
 Cryptandra micrantha Rye (W.A.)
 Cryptandra minutifolia Rye (W.A.)
Cryptandra minutifolia subsp. brevistyla Rye
Cryptandra minutifolia Rye subsp. minutifolia
 Cryptandra monticola Rye & Trudgen (W.A.)
 Cryptandra multispina Rye (W.A.)
 Cryptandra mutila Nees ex Reissek (W.A.)
 Cryptandra myriantha Diels (W.A.)
 Cryptandra nola Rye (W.A.)
 Cryptandra nutans Steud. (W.A.)
 Cryptandra orbicularis A.R.Bean (Qld.)
 Cryptandra pendula Rye (W.A.)
 Cryptandra pogonoloba A.R.Bean (Qld.)
Cryptandra pogonoloba A.R.Bean subsp. pogonoloba
Cryptandra pogonoloba subsp. septentrionalis Kellerman
 Cryptandra polyclada Diels (W.A.)
Cryptandra polyclada subsp. aequabilis Rye 
Cryptandra polyclada Diels subsp. polyclada
 Cryptandra propinqua A.Cunn. ex Fenzl (S.A., Qld., N.S.W.)
 Cryptandra propinqua subsp. maranoa Kellermann & Udovicic
 Cryptandra propinqua A.Cunn. ex Fenzl subsp. propinqua
 Cryptandra pungens Steud. (W.A.)
 Cryptandra recurva Rye (W.A.)
 Cryptandra scoparia Reissek (W.A.)
 Cryptandra speciosa A.Cunn. ex Kellermann & Udovicic (N.S.W., A.C.T., Vic.)
 Cryptandra speciosa A.Cunn. ex Kellermann & Udovicic subsp. speciosa
 Cryptandra speciosa subsp. strigosa Kellermann & Udovicic
 Cryptandra spinescens Sieber ex DC.  (N.S.W.)
 Cryptandra spyridioides F.Muell. (W.A.)
 Cryptandra stellulata Rye (W.A.)
 Cryptandra tomentosa Lindl. (S.A., Vic.)
 Cryptandra triplex K.R.Thiele ex Kellerman (N.T.)
 Cryptandra wilsonii Rye (W.A.)

References

External links
 

 
Rhamnaceae genera
Taxa named by James Edward Smith